Pillanallur is a panchayat town in Namakkal district in the Indian state of Tamil Nadu.

Demographics
 India census, Pillanallur had a population of 9213. Males constitute 50% of the population and females 50%. Pillanallur has an average literacy rate of 67%, higher than the national average of 59.5%: male literacy is 77%, and female literacy is 57%. In Pillanallur, 9% of the population is under 6 years of age.
Pillanallur panchayat includes pillanallur as well as Gurusamipalayam.Pillanallur is located in the highway of Rasipuram to Erode and 7 km away from Rasipuram.  Pillanallur is home for many well known temples such as Settiannan Kovil, Om kaaliamman kovil, subramaniar Kovil and Orattiannan kovil in the Azhagar malai. And Sengunthar mahajana schools are very well known school which had students from various nearby towns and villages.

Agriculture and weaving are the two major source of income of this area. The village is home for people from various caste/Religion.

References

Cities and towns in Namakkal district